Biogeophysics is a subdiscipline of geophysics concerned with how plants, microbial activity and other organisms alter geologic materials and affect geophysical signatures.

Introduction
The activities of the microbes are measured using geophysical imaging techniques. A lot of these techniques are based on the measurement of electric potential anomalies, which in this case can arise from microbes, their growth, metabolic by-products, and microbially mediated processes. The primary way in which these anomalies are generated can be explained by the electrical double layer. The effects are most visible when low frequency field is used as the surface charge of microbes is of low mobility.

See also 
 Astrobiology
 Biogeology
 Exploration geophysics
 Geomicrobiology
 Near-surface geophysics

References

Further reading

External links 
 American Geophysical Union Biogeosciences Section
 Journal of Geophysical Research - Biogeosciences
 European Geosciences Union (EGU) Division on Biogeosciences (BG) 
 Biogeosciences (journal published by the EGU)
 Advances in Astrobiology and Biogeophysics

Geomicrobiology